Kings Bay is a bay in the U.S. state of Georgia. 

Kings Bay was named after Thomas King, an early settler.

See also
Naval Submarine Base Kings Bay

References

Bays of Georgia (U.S. state)
Bodies of water of Camden County, Georgia